Level 42 are an English jazz-funk band from the Isle of Wight. Formed in late 1979, the group were originally an instrumental outfit consisting of bassist Mark King, keyboardist Mike Lindup, guitarist Rowland "Boon" Gould and drummer Phil Gould. Shortly after their formation, the band were encouraged to add vocals to their music, with both King and Lindup taking on lead vocalist duties. The group's lineup remained constant throughout much of the 1980s, before the Gould brothers left in October 1987. After suffering exhaustion on tour, Boon and Phil were replaced for shows at the end of the year by Paul Gendler and Neil Conti, respectively. Early the next year, King and Lindup enlisted Steve Topping and Gary Husband as their new permanent bandmates, after deciding against continuing with supporting musicians.

Topping left Level 42 due to musical differences after tour dates in early 1988. He was replaced later by Alan Murphy, who debuted on Staring at the Sun later in the year. On 19 October 1989, however, Murphy died of pneumonia resulting from AIDS. The group took a year off before returning to record Guaranteed, on which the three official members worked with guitarists Allan Holdsworth and Dominic Miller. Holdsworth also performed on tour dates in December 1990. Early the following year, before the album's release, Jakko Jakszyk joined as Murphy's permanent touring replacement. After more tour dates, Husband left Level 42 in March 1992. Phil Gould returned in his place the following year, although only for the recording of Forever Now. He was replaced for subsequent tour dates by Gavin Harrison.

After breaking up at the end of their 1994 tour, Level 42 reformed in late 2001 after King secured the rights to use the band name. Joining the frontman were his brother Nathan on guitar, Sean Freeman on saxophone, and returning members Husband (drums) and Lyndon Connah (keyboards). In 2003, an original lineup reunion was attempted by King, Lindup and the Gould brothers (along with frequent contributor Wally Badarou), however after "about four days" of writing new material it "just fell apart". Lindup collaborated with the band again in 2005 to record some keyboard parts for their new studio album Retroglide, before returning on a full-time basis the next year. Billy Cobham substituted for Husband at a number of shows in 2008, before the regular drummer was replaced by Pete Ray Biggin in 2010.

In October 2013, Level 42 released their first new studio material since 2006, the Sirens EP, which introduced new band members Dan Carpenter on trumpet and Nichol Thomson on trombone. The newly expanded horn section later joined the group on tour in 2014.

Members

Current

Former

Touring

Session

Timeline

Lineups

References

External links
Level 42 official website

Level 42